Ararat Sport Club is an Iraqi football team based in Erbil, that plays in Iraq Division Two.

History

in Premier League
Ararat team played in the Iraqi Premier League for the first time in the 2005–06 season, and the team was not good enough, and finished the season second from bottom in their group, and eventually relegated to the Iraq Division One.

Managerial history

  Farhan Jabbar 
  Hakeem Shaker 
  Saad Nasser

Honours

Domestic

National
Iraq Division One
Winners (1): 2004–05 (shared)

Regional
Kurdistan Regional Cup
Winners (1): 2006

References

External links
 Ararat SC on Goalzz.com
 Iraq Clubs- Foundation Dates

1996 establishments in Iraq
Association football clubs established in 1996
Football clubs in Erbil